Chlorocnemis superba is a species of damselfly in the family Protoneuridae. It is found in the Democratic Republic of the Congo, Tanzania, and Uganda. Its natural habitats are subtropical or tropical moist lowland forests, rivers, intermittent rivers, and freshwater springs. It is threatened by habitat loss.

References

Protoneuridae
Insects described in 1951
Taxonomy articles created by Polbot
Taxobox binomials not recognized by IUCN